Cannabichromevarin (CBCV), also known as cannabivarichromene) is one of over a 100 variants of cannabinoid chemical compounds that act on cannabinoid receptors. CBCV is a phytocannabinoid found naturally in cannabis, and is a propyl cannabinoid and an effective anticonvulsant and used to treat brain cancer and epilepsy

CBCV was first identified at the University of Nagasaki in 1975 from marijuana from Thailand. CBCV is not thought to be psychoactive or impairing in any way, and is believed to be safe for children and adults and is a compound found in medical marijuana.

References 

Phytocannabinoids
Benzopyrans